The 2014 Buffalo Bulls football team represented the University at Buffalo in the 2014 NCAA Division I FBS football season. They were led for the season's first seven games by fifth-year head coach Jeff Quinn before his midseason firing on October 13, and by interim head coach Alex Wood for the remainder of the season. The team played their home games at University at Buffalo Stadium and competed as a member of the East Division of the Mid-American Conference. They fished the season 5–6, 3–4 in MAC play to finish in third place in the East Division. They only played 11 games due to their November 19 game vs Kent State being canceled due to inclement weather. The failure to reschedule that canceled game cost the Bulls a chance at bowl eligibility.

Schedule

Schedule Source:

Hours before kickoff on November 19 against Kent State, the officials postponed the game due to the inclement weather that dropped four feet of lake effect snow in the region. Game officials had soon reschedule the match up two days later at a new time, 1:00 p.m. Later, it was announced that the two schools cancelled the game and will not reschedule due to the emergency situation.

Game summaries

Duquesne

In their first game of the season, the Bulls won, 38–28 over the Duquesne Dukes.

@ Army 

In their second game of the season, the Bulls lost, 47–39 to the Army Black Knights.

Baylor

In their third game of the season, the Bulls lost, 63–21 to the Baylor Bears.

Norfolk State

In their fourth game of the season, the Bulls won, 36–7 over the Norfolk State Spartans.

Miami (OH)

In their fifth game of the season, the Bulls won, 35–27 over the Miami RedHawks.

@ Bowling Green

In their sixth game of the season, the Bulls lost, 36–35 to the Bowling Green Falcons.

@ Eastern Michigan

In their seventh game of the season, the Bulls lost, 37–27 to the Eastern Michigan Eagles.

Central Michigan

In their eighth game of the season, the Bulls lost, 20–14 to the Central Michigan Chippewas.

@ Ohio

In their ninth game of the season, the Bulls lost, 37–14 to the Ohio Bobcats.

Akron

In their tenth game of the season, the Bulls won, 55–24 over the Akron Zips.

Kent State

The November 19 game between Kent State and Buffalo was initially postponed due to inclement weather and was never rescheduled. The cancellation eliminated Buffalo from bowl eligibility.

@ Massachusetts

In their eleventh game of the season, the Bulls won, 41–21 over the Massachusetts Minutemen.

References

Buffalo
Buffalo Bulls football seasons
Buffalo Bulls football